Sir Henry Chamberlain, 1st Baronet (1773– 31 July 1829) was a British diplomat, consul general to Portugal and chargé d'affaires to Brazil. He was created a baronet on 22 February 1828.

Henry was a natural son of the Honourable Henry Fane, Clerk to H.M. Treasury, a younger son of Thomas Fane, 8th Earl of Westmorland. He was brought up with the rest of Fane's children as a supposed distant relative, but when Chamberlain expressed interest in one of Fane's daughters (his half sister), he was informed of his true parentage and posted to Portugal in 1829 to become consul general, sailing on board HMS Briton.

On 1 January 1795 he married firstly Elizabeth Harrod, of Exeter, and in 1813 they were divorced by an Act of Parliament. Their children were:

 Sir Henry Chamberlain, 2nd Baronet (2 October 1796 – 8 September 1843)
 William Augustus Chamberlain (1797–1806)
 Eliza Caroline Chamberlain (d. 11 December 1887), who on 2 December 1819 married the Hon. Charles Orlando Bridgeman RN (died 13 April 1860), second son of Orlando Bridgeman, 1st Earl of Bradford.

On 5 June 1813 Henry Chamberlain married secondly Anne Eugenia, a daughter of William Morgan. Their children were:

 Anne Beresford Chamberlain (born 1815, Rio de Janeiro)
 Harriett Mary Chamberlain (born 1816, Rio de Janeiro)
 William Charles Chamberlain (21 April 1818 – 1878), born Rio de Janeiro Rear Admiral, R.N.
 Neville Bowles Chamberlain (10 January 1820 – 1902), born Rio de Janeiro, Field Marshal, British Army
 Crawford Trotter Chamberlain (1821–1902), General of the Indian Staff Corps
 Thomas H. Chamberlain (13 September 1822), born Rio de Janeiro
 Charles Francis Falcon Chamberlain (1826–1870), Lieutenant-Colonel in the Indian Army

Sources
 
 
 Baptismal Register of Christ Church, Rio de Janeiro

Footnotes

1773 births
1829 deaths
Baronets in the Baronetage of the United Kingdom
British diplomats
Henry